A financial district is usually a central area in a city where financial services firms such as banks, insurance companies and other related finance corporations have their head offices. In major cities, financial districts are often home to skyscrapers and other buildings of architectural importance and are called financial centres; such major centres also include important financial utilities such as stock exchanges and the offices of the main financial regulatory authorities.

List
Notable financial districts around the world include the following:

Africa

Algeria 
Algiers (الجزائر): Bab Ezzouar (باب الزوار)

Kenya 

 Nairobi: Upper Hill

Nigeria 
 Lagos: Lagos Island, Marina

Mauritius
Port Louis: Place D'armes

Morocco 
Casablanca (الدار البيضاء): Anfa (أنفا), Maârif (المعاريف), Sidi Belyout (سيدي بليوط), Sidi Maârouf (سيدي معروف), Bouskoura (بو سكورة)

South Africa
Johannesburg: Sandton

Americas

Argentina
Buenos Aires: Microcentro and Diagonal Norte

Brazil
Rio de Janeiro: Centro
São Paulo: Alphaville, Brooklin, Central Zone, Brigadeiro Faria Lima Avenue, Paulista Avenue, and Vila Olímpia

Canada
Montreal: Saint Jacques Street
Toronto: Financial District (Bay Street, a metonym for the district)
Vancouver: Financial District

Chile
Santiago: Sanhattan

Mexico
Guadalajara: Puerta de Hierro
Mexico City: Polanco, Paseo de la Reforma, and Santa Fe
Monterrey: Valle Oriente
Puebla: Angelopolis

Paraguay
Asuncion: Aviadores del Chaco Avenue

Peru
Lima: San Isidro, Miraflores and Historic Centre 
Arequipa: Cayma

United States
Atlanta: Buckhead
Boston: Financial District
Charlotte: Uptown
Chicago: LaSalle Street
Denver: Financial District
Detroit: Financial District
Hartford: Financial District
Houston: Downtown, Uptown
Jacksonville: Laura Street
Los Angeles: Financial District
Miami: Brickell
New Orleans: Central Business District
New York City: Financial District, Midtown Manhattan
Philadelphia: Penn Center
Salt Lake City: Financial District
San Francisco: Financial District
Seattle: Financial District
Des Moines: Financial District

Uruguay 

 Montevideo: Centro and Ciudad Vieja

Oceania

Australia
Sydney: Sydney central business district
Melbourne: Melbourne central business district
Brisbane: Brisbane central business district
Perth: Perth central business district
Adelaide: Adelaide central business district
Darwin: Darwin central business district

New Zealand
Auckland: Central Business District (CBD)

Asia

Bangladesh
Chittagong: Agrabad
Dhaka: Motijheel
Dhaka: Gulshan Thana
Dhaka: Kawran Bazar

China
Beijing: Beijing Financial Street
Shanghai: Lujiazui in Pudong
Shenzhen: Futian District
Guangzhou: Zhujiang New Town

Hong Kong

Central and Sheung Wan

India
Delhi: Connaught Place
Mumbai: Dalal Street and Bandra-Kurla Complex
Hyderabad: Financial District, Hyderabad, Bank Street, Hyderabad and Gachibowli
Ahmedabad: GIFT City
Trivandrum:Technopark

Indonesia
Jakarta: Jalan H.R. Rasuna Said, Jalan Jenderal Gatot Subroto, Jalan Jenderal Sudirman, and Jalan M.H. Thamrin
Malang: Klojen and Lowokwaru
Surabaya: Gubeng, Tunjungan, and Wonokromo
Yogyakarta: Malioboro
Bandung: Asia Afrika

Israel
Tel Aviv: Rothschild Boulevard

Japan
Nagoya: Naka-ku
Osaka: Chūō-ku
Tokyo: Marunouchi, Nihonbashi, and Otemachi

Lebanon
Beirut: Central District

Malaysia
George Town: Beach Street
Kuala Lumpur: Kuala Lumpur City Centre and Tun Razak Exchange (TRX)

Pakistan
Karachi: I. I. Chundrigar Road

Philippines
Makati: Makati Central Business District
Pasig: Ortigas Center
Taguig: Bonifacio Global City

Saudi Arabia
Riyadh: King Abdullah Financial District, King Fahad Road, Al Olaya District, Digital City, Riyadh Front, Business Gate and Granada Business.

Singapore
Shenton Way, Raffles Place

South Korea
Seoul: Yeouido and Teheranno

Taiwan
Taipei: Xinyi, Taipei Station and East End, Banqiao.
Taichung: Taichung's 7th Redevelopment Zone
Kaohsiung: Lingya, Cianjin

Thailand
Bangkok: Sathorn and Silom

Turkey
Istanbul: Levent, Ataşehir, Maslak and Ümraniye

Vietnam
Ho Chi Minh City: District 1

Europe

Belgium
Brussels: Northern Quarter

France
Lille: Euralille
Lyon: La Part-Dieu
Marseille: Euroméditerranée
Paris: La Défense

Germany
Berlin: Potsdamer Platz
Frankfurt: Bankenviertel

Greece
Athens: Sofokleous Street
Thessaloniki, Egnatia Street

Ireland
Dublin: International Financial Services Centre (IFSC)

Italy
 Milan: Centro Direzionale di Milano , Porta Nuova and City life
 Naples: Centro Direzionale di Napoli
 Rome: EUR

Netherlands
Amsterdam: Zuidas and Damrak

Poland
Warsaw: Śródmieście
Katowice: Śródmieście

Portugal
Lisbon: Lisbon Baixa , Parque das Nações , Avenidas Novas

Romania
Bucharest: Floreasca

Russia
Moscow: Moscow International Business Centre, Presnensky District, and Tverskoy District

Spain
Barcelona: 22@ and Granvia l'Hospitalet
Madrid: AZCA and CTBA

Switzerland
Zurich: Paradeplatz

United Kingdom
London: City of London, Lombard Street, London and Canary Wharf
Leeds: Financial Quarter
Glasgow: International Financial Services District

Norway
Oslo: Sentrum
Bergen: Bergenhus

See also
Central business district
Financial centre

Geography terminology
International finance
Offshore finance